Casswell is a station on Pittsburgh Regional Transit's light rail network, located in Bethel Park, Pennsylvania. The street level stop is designed as a small commuter stop, serving area residents who walk to the train so they can be taken toward Downtown Pittsburgh.

Casswell is sometimes referred to as Caswell, which seems to be a historic variation, as the PRT route map and station signs use Casswell, whilst the PRT stop finder uses Caswell and local businesses use both.

References

External links 

Port Authority T Stations Listings
Station from Google Maps Street View

Port Authority of Allegheny County stations
Railway stations in the United States opened in 1984
Blue Line (Pittsburgh)
Red Line (Pittsburgh)